Den evige Eva is a 1953 Norwegian drama film directed by Rolf Randall, photographed by Reidar Lund, production designed by Knut Yran.  The film is based on a novel by Sigbjørn Obstfelder, and starring Hjalmar Fries, Mona Hofland, Astri Jacobsen and Fridtjof Mjøen.

Rebekka (Jacobsen) is in a loveless marriage, and leaves her husband for the author Sigurd Winge (Mjøen). Also this relationship runs into problems, however, because of Winge's uncontrollable jealousy.

References

External links
 
 

1953 films
1953 drama films
Norwegian drama films
Norwegian black-and-white films